#1's is the first compilation album released by recording group Destiny's Child through Columbia Records on October 25, 2005. It was the last album released before they disbanded. The greatest hits album features the highest-charting singles from Destiny's Child's four studio albums released between 1998 and 2004 as well as a song from their remix album This Is the Remix released in 2002. In addition to already existing material, three new songs were recorded for the compilation —"Stand Up for Love", "Feel the Same Way I Do" and group member Beyoncé's collaboration with Slim Thug, "Check on It".

Following its release, #1's received positive reviews from music critics who praised the included material as the highlights of the group's music career. However, its title was dismissed as many of the songs included on the track listing had not reached the top position of a major record chart; it was later acknowledged by Billboard magazine that the title was only used as a marketing strategy. The compilation debuted and peaked on top of the US Billboard 200 album chart becoming the group's second album to reach number one in that country. It further peaked at number one in Japan and number six in the UK while also reaching the top forty in many European countries. The compilation received seven certifications by music trade organizations in different countries across the world. It further spawned two singles: "Stand Up for Love", which charted top 40 on the Gaon South Korea International chart in 2014, and "Check on It", which reached number one on the US Billboard Hot 100 and the top ten on many European charts.

Background and release 

Destiny's Child went to a hiatus, following the release of their third studio album Survivor (2001), allowing each member of the group to release solo material. As each member had success with their individual projects, questions arose by the public whether they would record again as a group. However, group members Beyoncé, Kelly Rowland and Michelle Williams reunited again to work on their fifth studio album Destiny Fulfilled. The album was released in late 2004 and the group further embarked on a worldwide tour Destiny Fulfilled... and Lovin' It the following year as part of its promotion. During a concert the group had at the Palau Sant Jordi in Barcelona, Spain on June 11, 2005, Rowland announced to the audience that the tour would be Destiny's Child last together, revealing their formal disbandment. It was announced that after their final North American leg, the group would part ways, with each member continuing their music career as a solo act. During an interview, they explained that their disbandment was planned during the making of Destiny Fulfilled as they discussed their individual aspirations and realized that remaining as a group would prevent them in pursuing those interests. However, it was acknowledged that the album would not be their last album together.

On August 1, 2005, Rowland announced the release of a greatest hits album later that year during an interview with Billboard magazine. She said, "We're definitely going to record another song for our greatest hits album for our fans. We're still thinking about it because we want it to mean something." In September, the album's title #1's was revealed along with a release date on October 25, 2005. A DualDisc edition of #1's was also announced with the same songs of the standard edition mixed in 5.1 surround sound on a CD as well as bonus content on a DVD containing seven music videos and a trailer for the live album Live in Atlanta (2005). The album was also released as a two-pack set at Walmart including the original CD and a DVD titled "Fan Pack II" which contained live performances of two songs, three music videos of the members' solo songs and bonus footage.

Content 
#1's contained charting songs from Destiny's Child's four studio albums Destiny's Child (1998), The Writing's on the Wall (1999), Survivor (2001) and Destiny Fulfilled (2004) as well as their remix album This Is the Remix (2002). Following the announcement of #1's, Billboard magazine questioned the criteria by which the inclusion of the songs would be determined as the group had only four number-one singles on the main US Billboard Hot 100 singles chart and only one single topped the Hot R&B/Hip-Hop Songs chart. However, Keith Caulfield of Billboard magazine later acknowledged in an article that its title was a marketing strategy as its liner notes did not offer information on the chart positions of the songs. "Bills, Bills, Bills", "Say My Name", "Independent Women" and "Bootylicious" were the band's four singles which topped the  Hot 100 chart while "No, No, No" topped the Hot R&B/Hip-Hop Songs. "Lose My Breath", "Soldier" featuring T.I and Lil Wayne and "Jumpin', Jumpin'" additionally topped other component Billboard charts; the former two peaked at number one on the Hot Dance Club Songs while the latter peaked at the top position of the Mainstream Top 40. Furthermore, "Survivor" did not peak at number one in any component Billboard chart, but it did so in Ireland's and UK's charts. In addition to those songs, the album contained charting singles which not necessarily reached number one on a music chart — "Emotion", "Bug a Boo", "Girl" and "Cater 2 U". AllMusic's Andy Kellman further noted that every charting single was included on the album with the exception of songs from the group's holiday album 8 Days of Christmas (2001). "Brown Eyes" which was not released as a single was featured as an international bonus track due to its appearance on a chart in the US. Similarly, "Nasty Girl" and "So Good" were placed as bonus songs on the album's Japanese edition.

The music on the album was noted to be contemporary R&B, pop and new age soul music; Sputnikmusic's John Hanson further described it as "filled" with bubblegum R&B pop. In addition to already released material, new songs were also recorded for the album, including "Stand Up for Love", Beyoncé's "Check on It" featuring Slim Thug and "Feel the Same Way I Do". "Stand Up for Love" was written by David Foster, his daughter Amy Foster-Gillies and Beyoncé while its production was handled by both Foster and Humberto Gatica. The ballad was inspired by poverty-stricken children and families which receive funds from charitable organization. "Check on It" was originally written by Beyoncé, Slim Thug, Angela Beyince and Sean Garrett for The Pink Panther 2006 soundtrack but was included on the compilation album and during the closing credits of the aforementioned film. It was later included on the track list of the international deluxe edition of Beyoncé's second studio album B'Day (2006). Slim Thug raps his lines backed by a bassline, while Beyoncé's vocals, further described as "R&B pipes" by Bret McCabe from the Baltimore City Paper, received comparisons to Donna Summer. A dance beat is present in the song along with quick hooks sung by Beyoncé. "Feel the Same Way I Do" was described as a track similar to soul songs by American group The Supremes instrumentally complete with "exotic" strings. Jess Harvell from Pitchfork Media felt its sound was suitable for Mariah Carey's The Emancipation of Mimi (2005).

Singles and promotion 
"Stand Up for Love" was released as the compilation's first single on September 27, 2005. It was termed as 2005 World Children's Day Anthem and used for a worldwide fundraiser for Ronald McDonald House Charities and several other local children's organizations. Critical commentary towards the song was generally negative and it failed to chart in the US becoming the band's first single to do so. "Stand Up for Love" became the group's last single together prior to their disbandment. The second single from the album, "Check on It" was released on December 13, 2005 and was later available for digital download on January 31, 2006 in the US. It managed to reach the top of the Hot 100 and three other component Billboard charts in the US. Worldwide, it topped the New Zealand Singles Chart, peaked at numbers two and three in Ireland and the UK and within the top ten in many other European countries. Destiny's Child performed "Stand Up for Love" and "Survivor" on November 15, 2005 on the television show Jimmy Kimmel Live! as their last TV performance together as a group. The former was performed by the band again the same day at Ronald McDonald House in Los Angeles for World Children's Day.

Critical reception 

Andy Kellman from AllMusic wrote in his review that #1's was formatted the same was as other music scores and anthologies packed for the holiday shopping season. He further commented that its title should have been different and concluded, "the disc reaffirms that Destiny's Child released some of the biggest R&B singles of the late '90s and early 2000s." Slant Magazine Sal Cinquemani criticized the album's title as only four of the singles reached number one on the Billboard Hot 100. However, he praised Destiny's Child's "impressive output, which includes some of the most recognizable R&B hits of the past bling/celly/status-obsessed five years". BBC Online's writer James Blake called the album "more than decent" and added that the group's success in the music industry was a notable reason for a greatest hits release. However, he argued that it was very soon to include songs from their final studio album, Destiny Fulfilled, as it was released only eleven months before #1's. Pitchfork Media's Jess Harvell felt that it was a "smart" move not to arrange the songs on the compilation in a chronological order and felt it "has the odd knock-on effect of suggesting that their legacy may be based on a smaller body of work than imagined". Harvell finished the review by writing, "you can take #1's as pure product and not feel wrong for doing so". Despite classifying its title as "misleading" and criticizing the new material, Houston Chronicles editor Michael D. Clark wrote the album was "dolled up as beautiful and immaculate as" the members of the group and included their best singles from their four studio albums.

John A. Hanson of Sputnikmusic felt that the greatest hits album was released "at the perfect time" as many of the songs were released a long time ago and "they've lost the overplayedness, but its  soon enough that they still have some sort of relevance". He concluded for the album, "[it] hits you with recognizable hit after recognizable hit, and they are all pretty much as perfect as contemporary R&B-pop gets". Describing the album as a "masterclass in what happens when a great band comes together", Yahoo! Music's Hattie Collins wrote, "Despite the low-points, this is a Destiny's Child must have collection of classics from one of R&B's most significant talents". A more mixed review came from Fiona Mckinlay from the website musicOMH who felt the album included many "skippable" songs and noted that the material from The Writing's on the Wall and Survivor were the collection's best. She felt that the progress in the sound of the band was evident on #1's, but offered the opinion, "As far as greatest hits albums go, Destiny's Child show themselves to be pretty ace, but still not quite the incredible force in R&B". San Francisco Chronicle Aidin Vaziri criticized the songs from Destiny Fulfilled and "Stand Up for Love" and concluded "surveying Destiny's Child's entire career on this set... it's obvious their hearts slipped away around the same time Beyoncé's solo album sold its first million".

Commercial performance 
In its first week, #1's sold 113,000 copies in the United States according to Nielsen SoundScan and debuted at number one on the Billboard 200 for the chart issue dated November 12, 2005. It became the band's second number one album on that chart following Survivor in 2001. In its second week of charting, the compilation fell to the position of number five selling 85,000 copies with a decrease of 25% of the previous sales. It also debuted atop the Top R&B/Hip-Hop Albums charts during the same week as it debuted on the Billboard 200. It has been certified platinum by the Recording Industry Association of America (RIAA) for shipment of 1,000,000 copies. In Canada, the compilation received a platinum certification by Music Canada (MC) for selling 100,000 units.

In the UK, the compilation debuted and peaked at number six on the UK Albums Chart on November 5, 2005. It became the group's fourth top ten entry in that country. In the week of the release of Beyoncé's studio album 4, on July 9, 2011, #1's climbed from the position of 111 back to 54 in its forty second charting week in that country. The same week, it set a peak on the UK R&B Albums Chart at number 12 in its fortieth. It was certified platinum in the UK on July 22, 2013 by the British Phonographic Industry for shipment of 300,000 copies. In Ireland, the compilation debuted at number ten on the Irish Albums Chart for the week ending October 27, 2005. The following week, it moved to number eight on the chart which also became its peak position in that country. The Irish Recorded Music Association (IRMA) certified #1's double platinum for selling 30,000 copies in that country. Across other European countries, the album peaked within the top ten in Switzerland and the Flanders region in Belgium, within the top thirty in Germany and the Wallonia region of Belgium and within the top forty in Austria, Netherlands, Norway, Spain and Sweden.

On November 6, 2005, the compilation debuted on the position of 13 on the Australian ARIA Charts. The following week it moved to ten and spent a total of 19 weeks on the chart. It was certified platinum by the Australian Recording Industry Association (ARIA) for shipment of 70,000 copies. In New Zealand it peaked at number three on the country's albums chart in its second week of charting. The Recorded Music NZ (RMNZ) certified it platinum for shipment of 15,000 copies in that country. In Japan, #1's debuted at number one on the Oricon albums chart, selling 154,859 copies in its first week. In 2005, it was eventually certified double platinum by the Recording Industry Association of Japan (RIAJ) for selling 500,000 copies in that country. The same year, #1's was ranked as the twentieth best-selling album in the world.

Track listing 

Sample Credits
 "Bootylicious" contains elements from "Edge of Seventeen", performed and written by Stevie Nicks.
 "Girl" contains sampled elements from the composition "Ocean of Thoughts and Dreams", performed by the Dramatics, written by Don Davis and Eddie Robinson.
 "No, No, No Part 2" contains elements from "Strange Games and Things", performed and written by Barry White.

Charts

Weekly charts

Year-end charts

Certifications

Release history

See also 
List of Billboard 200 number-one albums of 2005
List of Billboard number-one R&B albums of 2005
List of Oricon number-one albums of 2005

Notes

References

External links 
 #1's at Discogs
 #1's at Tidal

2005 greatest hits albums
Destiny's Child albums
Destiny's Child video albums
Albums produced by David Foster
Albums produced by Humberto Gatica
Albums produced by Swizz Beatz
Albums produced by 9th Wonder
Albums produced by Rodney Jerkins
Albums produced by Wyclef Jean
Albums produced by Rich Harrison
2005 video albums
Compilation albums of number-one songs